Úľany nad Žitavou is a village and municipality in the Nové Zámky District in the Nitra Region of south-west Slovakia.
It is also known as Fedýmeš nad Žitavou.

History
In historical records the village was first mentioned in 1284.

Geography
The municipality lies at an elevation of 126 metres (861 ft) and covers an area of 8.4 km² (3.2 mi²). It has a population of about 1545 people.

Ethnicity
The population is about 99% Slovak.

Facilities
The village has a small public library a gym and football pitch.

External links
 
 
 http://www.statistics.sk/mosmis/eng/run.html
 Úľany nad Žitavou – Nové Zámky Okolie

 Falling Grain

Villages and municipalities in Nové Zámky District